Kappa Eridani, Latinized from κ Eridani, is a solitary star in the constellation Eridanus. With an apparent visual magnitude of 4.25, it is bright enough to be visible to the naked eye on a dark night. Based upon an annual parallax shift of 0.00642 arc seconds, it is roughly 510 light years distant from the Sun.

This appears to be an evolving B-type subgiant star with a stellar classification of B7 IV. At an estimated distance of Kappa Eridani, this yields a physical size of about six times the radius of the Sun. It has five times the Sun's mass, and radiates 1,175 times the solar luminosity from its outer atmosphere at an effective temperature of 14,700 K. Kappa Eridani is spinning with a projected rotational velocity of 10 km/s and is around 93 million years old.

References

B-type subgiants
Eridanus (constellation)
Eridani, Kappa
015371
011407
0721
Durchmusterung objects